Deward Homan "Tiny" Reed was the first head football coach for Eastern New Mexico University in Portales, New Mexico and he held that position for the 1934 season.  His overall coaching record at Eastern NMU was 7 wins, 0 losses, and 2 ties.  This ranks him
tenth at Eastern NMU in terms of total wins and first at Eastern NMU in terms of winning percentage. Reed also coached the basketball team for two seasons.

References

Year of birth missing
Year of death missing
College men's basketball head coaches in the United States
Eastern New Mexico Greyhounds football coaches
Eastern New Mexico Greyhounds men's basketball coaches